And Who Is Kissing Me? is a 1933 German comedy film directed by E. W. Emo and starring Georg Alexander, Marion Taal, and Felix Bressart. It was shot at the Johannisthal Studios in Berlin. The film's sets were designed by the art director Max Heilbronner. A separate Italian-language version The Girl with the Bruise was also released. It was loosely remade as a 1937 British film Paradise for Two, a 1940 Swedish film Kiss Her! and a 1951 British film Happy Go Lovely.

Cast

References

Bibliography 
 Klaus, Ulrich J. Deutsche Tonfilme: Jahrgang 1933. Klaus-Archiv, 1988.

External links 
 

1933 films
Films of the Weimar Republic
German comedy films
1933 comedy films
1930s German-language films
Films directed by E. W. Emo
German black-and-white films
German multilingual films
1933 multilingual films
1930s German films
Films shot at Johannisthal Studios